Honeymoon (Italian: Luna di miele) is a 1941 Italian film directed by Giacomo Gentilomo and starring Assia Noris, Aldo Fiorelli and Luigi Cimara. It was made at the Pisorno Studios in Tirrenia.

Cast
 Assia Noris as Nicoletta 
 Aldo Fiorelli as Mario  
 Luigi Cimara as Valerio, zio di Mario 
 Carlo Campanini as Annibale  
 Clelia Matania as Anna 
 Ernesto Almirante as Ernesto Gelardi  
 Franco Scandurra as Pettinelli  
 Giacomo Moschini as Bosio  
 Olga Vittoria Gentilli as La signora Bosio  
 Emilio Petacci as Giovanni 
 Diana Dei
 Alberto Marchió 
 Tina Maver 
 Alma Nerei
 Giovanni Petrucci 
 Eugenia Zaresca

References

Bibliography
 Luciano De Giusti. Giacomo Gentilomo, cineasta popolare. Kaplan, 2008.

External links

1941 films
1940s Italian-language films
Films directed by Giacomo Gentilomo
Films shot at Tirrenia Studios
Italian black-and-white films
1940s Italian films